Gardesh is a village in Dehdez Rural District, Dehdez District, Izeh County, Khuzestan Province, Iran. At the 2006 census, its population was 178, in 29 families.

References 

Populated places in Izeh County